CoRoT-5b (previously named CoRoT-Exo-5b) is an extrasolar planet orbiting the F type star CoRoT-5. It was first reported by the CoRoT mission team in 2008 using a transit method.
This planet has been confirmed by a Doppler follow-up study.

Properties and location
This planetary object is reported to be about half the mass but slightly larger than the planet Jupiter at 0.467(+0.047, -0.024) M_Jup.

See also
 CoRoT-6b

References

External links

 ESA Portal - Exoplanet hunt update

Hot Jupiters
Transiting exoplanets
Exoplanets discovered in 2008
Giant planets
5b

Monoceros (constellation)